KRI dr. Radjiman Wedyodiningrat (992) is the second ship of the s of the Indonesian Navy. The ship was named after an Indonesian national hero Rajiman Wediodiningrat.

Construction and career 
The construction of the ship started with the first steel cutting ceremony on 10 September 2020. Its keel was laid on 21 January 2021. KRI dr. Radjiman Wedyodiningrat was named and launched in a ceremony on 15 August 2022. The ceremony was attended by Chief of Staff of the Indonesian Navy Admiral Yudo Margono along with other Indonesian Navy officers, government and related companies officials, and relatives of Rajiman Wediodiningrat. On 16–19 December, the ship underwent sea acceptance tests in the Java Sea. dr. Radjiman Wedyodiningrat was commissioned on 19 January 2023 at Bandar Barat Pier, PAL Indonesia in Surabaya.

References 

Sudirohusodo-class hospital ships
Ships built in Indonesia
2022 ships